The  is an annual project launched in 2010, and funded by the Japanese government's Agency for Cultural Affairs in order to support training animators. The project culminates in a series of anime shorts produced by various animation studios each year called:
Project A, released in 2011
, released in 2012–2015
, released in 2016-2020
, released since 2021

History
The project was launched by Japanese Animation Creators Association (JAniCA) in 2010. The animation labor group received 214.5 million yen (about US$2.27 million) from the Japanese government's Agency for Cultural Affairs, and it distributed most of those funds to studios to train young animators on-the-job during the year. One of the reasons for the support of the Agency for Cultural Affairs is the concern that more of the Japanese animation process is being outsourced overseas—thus leading to a decline in opportunities to teach animation techniques within Japan. In 2011 the Agency once again provided funding for JAniCA to select more young training projects under the same budgets.

In April 2014, JAniCA announced that they are no longer running the initiative. Later it was announced that The Association of Japanese Animations (AJA) will run the project.

Animations
The following animations were created out of the funding provided by the Young Animator Training Project. Animation studios bid for funding, and each year, four studios are selected to produce short films. All short films air in theaters each year in March.

Project A
The following shorts were produced in 2010.
 
 - Ascension
 - Telecom Animation Film
 - P.A.Works
 - Production I.G

Anime Mirai 2012
The following shorts were produced in 2011.

BUTA - Telecom Animation Film
 - Production I.G
 - Shirogumi
 - Answer Studio

Anime Mirai 2013
The following shorts were produced in 2012.

 - Gonzo
 - Trigger
 - Zexcs
 - Madhouse

Aruvu Rezuru replaced an intended short, TV Kazoku Channel Jacker, that was to be produced by Pierrot.

Anime Mirai 2014
The following shorts were produced in 2013.

 - Ultra Super Pictures
 - A-1 Pictures
 - Shin-Ei Animation
 - Studio 4°C

Anime Mirai 2015
The following shorts were produced in 2014.

 - J.C.Staff
 - SynergySP
 - Studio Deen
 - Tezuka Productions

Anime Tamago 2016
The following shorts were produced in 2015. This is the first year after The Association of Japanese Animations (AJA) took over this project and renamed it to Anime Tamago.

 - Signal.MD
UTOPA - Studio 4°C
 - Tezuka Productions
 - Buemon

Anime Tamago 2017
The following shorts were produced in 2016.
 - Studio Comet
Red Ash: Gearworld - Studio 4°C
 - Nippon Animation
 - WAO Corporation, Studio Live, SSS-Studio

Anime Tamago 2018
The following shorts were produced in 2017.
 - Imagica Image Works, Robot
 - Studio Nanahoshi, Usagi.Ou
 - Tomason
Midnight Crazy Trail - Pinako

Anime Tamago 2019
The following shorts were produced in 2018.
 - Wit Studio
 - Nippon Animation
 - Keica, Griot Groove
 - Flying Ship Studio

Anime Tamago 2020
The following shorts were produced in 2019.
 - Speed Inc.
 - Vega Entertainment [ja]
 - Yumeta Company

Animenotane 2021
The following shorts were produced in 2020. While the name was changed, AJA is still in charge of the project. Shorts produced for Animenotane are 7-10 minutes, instead of the usual 24 in previous years.
 - Imagica
 - Usagi ou inc.
"HOME!" - Orange
 - Tsumugi Akita Anime Lab

Animenotane 2022
The following shorts have been announced for production in 2021
 - Imagica
 - Studio elle
 - Production +h
 - Lesprit

References

External links
 Project A official website 
 Anime Mirai official website 
 Anime Tamago official website 
 Animenotane official website 

Anime industry
2010 establishments in Japan